The Hotchkiss M1909 machine gun was a light machine gun of the early 20th century, developed and built by Hotchkiss et Cie. It was also known as the Hotchkiss Mark I, Hotchkiss Portative and M1909 Benét–Mercié.

Design
It was based on a design by Austrian nobleman and Army officer, Adolf Odkolek von Újezd, who sold the manufacturing rights to Hotchkiss in 1893. Several improved versions were designed by Hotchkiss's American manager, Laurence Benét and his French assistant, Henri Mercié.

Initial models were fed by a 30-round feed strip but later models could be either strip-fed or belt-fed. The U.S. types had a bipod, while some others used a small tripod. This tripod, fitted under the firearm, could be moved with the weapon, and thus was very different from larger, heavier tripods of the period.

Manufacture
Production began at the Hotchkiss factory in Saint-Denis, Paris, but in 1914, with the invading German army threatening the city, the French military authorities ordered the factory to be moved to Lyon. The following year, the British government invited Hotchkiss to set up a factory in Coventry. By the end of the war, this factory had manufactured over 40,000 M1909s.

The U.S. version was made by Springfield Armory and by Colt's Manufacturing Company. Total production for the United States was 670.  This was small compared to the huge production runs of firearms later in the 20th century, but this was a significant number for the size of the contemporary U.S. Army.  The M1909's adoption coincided with the withdrawal of the .30-06 manually operated Gatling guns from the U.S. Army's arsenals.

Service
As the Hotchkiss M1909 (or Mle 1909), firing the 8 mm Lebel, it was adopted by the French military in 1909 but not issued as an infantry weapon. The 700 examples manufactured were used in the fortresses at Verdun in a defensive capacity, on some fighter aircraft, and in Mark V* tanks acquired from Great Britain.

A variant to use the .303 round was produced in Britain at the Coventry factory as the "Hotchkiss Mark I" and issued to some cavalry regiments. The MkI* variant, with the wooden stock replaced with a pistol grip, was widely used in British tanks during World War I.

It was adopted by the United States in 1909 as the "Benét–Mercié Machine Rifle, Caliber .30 U. S. Model of 1909" firing the .30-06 cartridge. It was also used by other countries, including Belgium, Sweden and Mexico. France and Britain used the Hotchkiss M1909 through World War I and on into World War II. The Australian Light Horse, the New Zealand Mounted Rifles Brigade, the Imperial Camel Corps, and the Duke of Lancaster's Own Yeomanry used the Hotchkiss in the Sinai and Palestine Campaign (1915–17). U.S. forces used the Benét–Mercié at the Battle of Columbus in 1916 (4 guns fired 20,000 rounds total in the engagement), in the subsequent Pancho Villa Expedition in Mexico of 1916–17, and initially in France.  

On the American guns, firing pins and extractors broke frequently. Some members of the U.S. press derisively called the M1909 the "daylight gun" because of the difficulty in replacing broken parts at night and  jams caused when a loading strip was inserted upside down in darkness. Major Julian Hatcher was assigned to look into the issue after Columbus and found almost all the issues were due to inadequate training.  U.S. troops during the Villa Expedition received additional training and the M1909 was considered an effective weapon. During service in the Villa Expedition in 1916, the M1909 was fitted with the Model 1908 Warner & Swasey Musket Sight (more well known as an early telescopic sight on the M1903 Springfield Rifle) to aid in long-range firing. U.S. production had already ceased before World War I and only a small number were available to the U.S. military. However, the U.S. Navy still used them in that period.

Users

: Used in armored cars by the Irish National Army during the Irish Civil War

 Spain

Gallery

See also
Light machine gun
List of individual weapons of the U.S. Armed Forces
Huot automatic rifle
Chauchat - Another French light machine gun that was also used by the U.S. Army
Hotchkiss M1922 machine gun

References

Further reading

External links

 Images from the Museum of the Soldier, Portland, Indiana.
 More images: 1, 2
 
 
  Animation of the Hotchkiss portative .303 machine gun.
  (many good plates)
 

 Collection of photos that appear to be either U.S. Army photos or published before 1922
 Machine Gun Troop Soldier
 Benet-Mercier Rifle Platoon Postcard
 More Machine Gun Troops on Border, 1914
 Motorcycle Machine Gun Troop
 M1909 Benet-Mercier Machine Gun Motorcycle Mounted Rifle Platoon Postcard
 Benet-Mercier Machine Gun Platoon 27th Infantry, 1913
 Benet-Mercier Group

8 mm machine guns
.303 British machine guns
.30-06 Springfield machine guns
World War I French infantry weapons
World War II infantry weapons of France
World War I machine guns
Light machine guns
Machine guns of France
M1909